Pleasant Mount is an unincorporated community in Mount Pleasant Township, Wayne County, Pennsylvania, United States.

References

Unincorporated communities in Wayne County, Pennsylvania
Unincorporated communities in Pennsylvania
Pocono Mountains